The Augsburg–Buchloe railway is a double-track main line in the German state of Bavaria. It runs from Augsburg to Buchloe. Other major towns on the route are Bobingen and Schwabmünchen. It was built as part of the Ludwig South-North Railway, one of the oldest lines in Germany.

History
The construction of the 60.2 km long line from Augsburg Hauptbahnhof via Bobingen and Buchloe to Kaufbeuren was authorised by a Bavarian law of 25 August 1843 and opened on 1 September 1847. The 20.3 km long section from Buchloe to Kaufbeuren is now considered part of the Buchloe–Lindau railway.

Operations
Under the 2016 timetable passenger services operate on line on the following routes:

A daily Intercity train also operates between Augsburg and Oberstdorf.

There are additional trains between Augsburg and Schwabmünchen and between Augsburg and Buchloe, creating a half-hourly service between Augsburg and Buchloe.

The trains of the Allgäu-Franken-Express operate since the timetable change in December 2006, to replace a part of the ICE trains, which since then ride the high-speed line Ingolstadt-Munich instead of Nuremberg-Augsburg route. There are operate daily 2 pairs of trains. Since the Tunel Oberstaufen is renovated in 2016, the train-operation is limited to Immenstadt and Oberstdorf.

Notes

References

 

Railway lines in Bavaria
Rail transport in Augsburg
Railway lines opened in 1847
1847 establishments in Bavaria
Buildings and structures in Augsburg (district)